Max Rychner (8 April 1897 in Lichtensteig, Switzerland – 10 June 1965 in Zurich) - was a Swiss writer, journalist, translator, and literary critic, writing in German. Hannah Arendt called him "[O]ne of the most educated and subtle figures in the intellectual life of the era"

Rychner published several books of poetry, short stories, essays, and autobiographical prose, and translated some of the works of Paul Valéry into German. For several decades, he was one of the most influential literary critics and reviewers writing in German. He admired, promoted, and published the works of Robert Walser, and corresponded with Hugo von Hofmannsthal, Thomas Mann, Gottfried Benn, Ernst Robert Curtius, and others.

He championed the young poet Paul Celan and published the memoirs of Walter Benjamin.

In 1956, Rychner won the Gottfried Keller Award.

Published works

Bei mir laufen Fäden zusammen. Literarische Aufsätze, Kritiken, Briefe. Literarische Aufsätze, Kritiken, Briefe. Göttingen: Wallstein Verlag, 1998 Göttingen: Wallstein Verlag, 1998

References
 
 
Bedachte und bezeugte Welt: Prosa, Gedichte, Aphorismen, Aufsätze. Max Rychner zum 65. Geburtstag. Darmstadt; Hamburg: Schröder, 1962. 
Leśniak S. Thomas Mann, Max Rychner, Hugo von Hofmannsthal und Rudolf Kassner: eine Typologie essayistischer Formen. Würzburg: Königshausen & Neumann, 2005. 
Buss M. Intellektuelles Selbstverständnis und Totalitarismus: Denis de Rougemont und Max Rychner, zwei Europäer der Zwischenkriegszeit. Frankfurt/Main: P. Lang, 2005. 

Swiss literary critics
Swiss translators
Swiss essayists
Swiss male poets
1897 births
1965 deaths
Writers from Zürich
20th-century Swiss poets
20th-century male writers
20th-century translators
Male essayists
20th-century essayists
20th-century Swiss journalists